A Carnot heat engine is a heat engine that operates on the Carnot cycle. The basic model for this engine was developed by Nicolas Léonard Sadi Carnot in 1824. The Carnot engine model was graphically expanded by Benoît Paul Émile Clapeyron in 1834 and mathematically explored by Rudolf Clausius in 1857, work that led to the fundamental thermodynamic concept of entropy. The Carnot engine is the most efficient heat engine which is theoretically possible. The efficiency depends only upon the absolute temperatures of the hot and cold heat reservoirs between which it operates.

A heat engine acts by transferring energy from a warm region to a cool region of space and, in the process, converting some of that energy to mechanical work. The cycle may also be reversed. The system may be worked upon by an external force, and in the process, it can transfer thermal energy from a cooler system to a warmer one, thereby acting as a refrigerator or heat pump rather than a heat engine.

Every thermodynamic system exists in a particular state. A thermodynamic cycle occurs when a system is taken through a series of different states, and finally returned to its initial state. In the process of going through this cycle, the system may perform work on its surroundings, thereby acting as a heat engine.

Carnot's diagram 
In the adjacent diagram, from Carnot's 1824 work, Reflections on the Motive Power of Fire, there are "two bodies A and B, kept each at a constant temperature, that of A being higher than that of B. These two bodies to which we can give, or from which we can remove the heat without causing their temperatures to vary, exercise the functions of two unlimited reservoirs of caloric. We will call the first the furnace and the second the refrigerator.” Carnot then explains how we can obtain motive power, i.e., “work”, by carrying a certain quantity of heat from body A to body B.
It also acts as a cooler and hence can also act as a refrigerator.

Modern diagram 

The previous image shows the original piston-and-cylinder diagram used by Carnot in discussing his ideal engine. The figure at right shows a block diagram of a generic heat engine, such as the Carnot engine. In the diagram, the “working body” (system), a term introduced by Clausius in 1850, can be any fluid or vapor body through which heat Q can be introduced or transmitted to produce work. Carnot had postulated that the fluid body could be any substance capable of expansion, such as vapor of water, vapor of alcohol, vapor of mercury, a permanent gas, air, etc. Although in those early years, engines came in a number of configurations, typically QH was supplied by a boiler, wherein water was boiled over a furnace; QC was typically removed by a stream of cold flowing water in the form of a condenser located on a separate part of the engine. The output work, W, is transmitted by the movement of the piston as it is used to turn a crank-arm, which in turn was typically used to power a pulley so as to lift water out of flooded salt mines. Carnot defined work as “weight lifted through a height”.

Carnot cycle

The Carnot cycle when acting as a heat engine consists of the following steps:

 Reversible isothermal expansion of the gas at the "hot" temperature, TH (isothermal heat addition or absorption). During this step (A to B) the gas is allowed to expand and it does work on the surroundings. The temperature of the gas (the system) does not change during the process, and thus the expansion is isothermic. The gas expansion is propelled by absorption of heat energy QH and of entropy  from the high temperature reservoir.
 Isentropic (reversible adiabatic) expansion of the gas (isentropic work output). For this step (B to C) the piston and cylinder are assumed to be thermally insulated, thus they neither gain nor lose heat. The gas continues to expand, doing work on the surroundings, and losing an equivalent amount of internal energy. The gas expansion causes it to cool to the "cold" temperature, TC. The entropy remains unchanged.
 Reversible isothermal compression of the gas at the "cold" temperature, TC. (isothermal heat rejection) (C to D) Now the gas is exposed to the cold temperature reservoir while the surroundings do work on the gas by compressing it (such as through the return compression of a piston), while causing an amount of waste heat QC < 0 (with the standard sign convention for heat) and of entropy  to flow out of the gas to the low temperature reservoir. (In magnitude, this is the same amount of entropy absorbed in step 1. The entropy decreases in isothermal compression since the multiplicity of the system decreases with the volume.) In terms of magnitude, the recompression work performed by the surroundings in this step is less than the work performed on the surroundings in step 1 because it occurs at a lower pressure due to the lower temperature (i.e. the resistance to compression is lower under step 3 than the force of expansion under step 1).
 Isentropic compression of the gas (isentropic work input). (D to A) Once again the piston and cylinder are assumed to be thermally insulated and the cold temperature reservoir is removed. During this step, the surroundings continue to do work to further compress the gas and both the temperature and pressure rise now that the heat sink has been removed. This additional work increases the internal energy of the gas, compressing it and causing the temperature to rise to TH. The entropy remains unchanged. At this point the gas is in the same state as at the start of step 1.

Carnot's theorem 

Carnot's theorem is a formal statement of this fact: No engine operating between two heat reservoirs can be more efficient than a Carnot engine operating between the same reservoirs.

Explanation 
This maximum efficiency  is defined as above:
  is the work done by the system (energy exiting the system as work),
  is the heat put into the system (heat energy entering the system),
  is the absolute temperature of the cold reservoir, and
  is the absolute temperature of the hot reservoir.

A corollary to Carnot's theorem states that: All reversible engines operating between the same heat reservoirs are equally efficient.

It is easily shown that the efficiency  is maximum when the entire cyclic process is a reversible process. This means the total entropy of system and surroundings (the entropies of the hot furnace, the "working fluid" of the heat engine, and the cold sink) remains constant when the "working fluid" completes one cycle and returns to its original state. (In the general and more realistic case of an irreversible process, the total entropy of this combined system would increase.)

Since the "working fluid" comes back to the same state after one cycle, and entropy of the system is a state function, the change in entropy of the "working fluid" system is 0. Thus, it implies that the total entropy change of the furnace and sink is zero, for the process to be reversible and the efficiency of the engine to be maximum. This derivation is carried out in the next section.

The coefficient of performance (COP) of the heat engine is the reciprocal of its efficiency.

Efficiency of real heat engines 

For a real heat engine, the total thermodynamic process is generally irreversible. The working fluid is brought back to its initial state after one cycle, and thus the change of entropy of the fluid system is 0, but the sum of the entropy changes in the hot and cold reservoir in this one cyclical process is greater than 0.

The internal energy of the fluid is also a state variable, so its total change in one cycle is 0. So the total work done by the system  is equal to the net heat put into the system, the sum of  > 0 taken up and the waste heat  < 0 given off:

For real engines, stages 1 and 3 of the Carnot cycle, in which heat is absorbed by the "working fluid" from the hot reservoir, and released by it to the cold reservoir, respectively, no longer remain ideally reversible, and there is a temperature differential between the temperature of the reservoir and the temperature of the fluid while heat exchange takes place.

Let  be the total entropy change of the fluid in the process of intake of heat.

So, one would get:

Similarly, at the time of heat injection from the fluid to the cold reservoir one would have, for the magnitude of total entropy change < 0 of the fluid in the process of expelling heat:

We have only considered the magnitude of the entropy change here. Since the total change of entropy of the fluid system for the cyclic process is 0, we must have

The previous three equations combine to give:

Equations and  combine to give

Hence,

For the Carnot engine, the entire process is 'reversible', and Equation is an equality. Hence, the efficiency of the real engine is always less than the ideal Carnot engine.

Equation signifies that the total entropy of system and surroundings (the fluid and the two reservoirs) increases for the real engine, because (in a surroundings-based analysis) the entropy gain of the cold reservoir as  flows into it at the fixed temperature , is greater than the entropy loss of the hot reservoir as  leaves it at its fixed temperature . The inequality in Equation is essentially the statement of the Clausius theorem.

According to the second theorem, "The efficiency of the Carnot engine is independent of the nature of the working substance".

The Carnot engine and Rudolf Diesel
In 1892 Rudolf Diesel patented an internal combustion engine inspired by the Carnot engine.  Diesel knew a Carnot engine is an ideal that cannot be built, but he thought he had invented a working approximation.  His principle was unsound, but in his struggle to implement it he developed the practical engine that bears his name.

The conceptual problem was how to achieve isothermal expansion in an internal combustion engine, since burning fuel at the highest temperature of the cycle would only raise the temperature further.  Diesel's patented solution was: having achieved the highest temperature just by compressing the air, to add a small amount of fuel at a controlled rate, such that heating caused by burning the fuel would be counteracted by cooling caused by air expansion as the piston moved.  Hence all the heat from the fuel would be transformed into work during the isothermal expansion, as required by Carnot's theorem.

For the idea to work a small mass of fuel would have to be burnt in a huge mass of air.  Diesel first proposed a working engine that would compress air to 250 atmospheres at 800 °C, then cycle to one atmosphere at 20 °C.  However, this was well beyond the technological capabilities of the day, since it implied a compression ratio of 60:1. Such an engine, could it have been built, would have had an efficiency of 73%.  (In contrast, the best steam engines of his day achieved 7%.)

Accordingly, Diesel sought to compromise.  He calculated that, were he to reduce the peak pressure to a less ambitious 90 atmospheres, he would sacrifice only 5% of the thermal efficiency.  Seeking financial support, he published the "Theory and Construction of a Rational Heat Engine to Take the Place of the Steam Engine and All Presently Known Combustion Engines" (1893).  Endorsed by scientific opinion, including Lord Kelvin, he won the backing of Krupp and Maschinenfabrik Augsburg.  He clung to the Carnot cycle as a symbol.  But years of practical work failed to achieve an isothermal combustion engine, nor could have done, since it requires such an enormous quantity of air that it cannot develop enough power to compress it.  Furthermore, controlled fuel injection turned out to be no easy matter.

Even so, it slowly evolved over 25 years to become a practical high-compression air engine, its fuel injected near the end of the compression stroke and ignited by the heat of compression, in a word, the diesel engine.  Today its efficiency is 40%.

Notes

External links

References 

 (First Edition 1824) and (Reissued Edition of 1878)
 (full text of 1897 ed.) (Archived HTML version)

Engines
Thermodynamic cycles